Marissa Coleman (born January 4, 1987) is an American professional basketball player previously played for the New York Liberty of the Women's National Basketball Association (WNBA).

Personal life
Coleman was born in Portland, Oregon to Tony and Joni Coleman. She has an older sister, LaTonya, and a younger brother, Anthony. Later they moved to Cheltenham, Maryland where Coleman attended high school at St. John's College High School,  a co-ed Christian Brother's Catholic school in Washington, DC.

High school career
Coleman went to high school at St. John's College High School. Coleman was a McDonald's and WBCA All-American, playing in both senior all-star games. She led all scorers with 19 points at the McDonald's game. She was selected East Team Most Valuable Player at the WBCA game.

College career
Coleman chose the University of Maryland, College Park over the University of Tennessee, the University of Connecticut, the University of Florida, and Duke University. As a freshman, she became the second-straight Terrapin to be named ACC Rookie of the Year. She was only the ninth Terrapin all-time with 1,500 career points. She is one of only four Terps in the history of the program to receive All-ACC honors three times, earning a spot on the second team every year. She is 2nd all-time at Maryland in rebounding and scoring. She is one of only two players in school history to record a triple-double.

Maryland statistics
Source

USA Basketball

Coleman was a member of the USA Women's U18 team which won the gold medal at the FIBA Americas Championship in Mayaguez, Puerto Rico. The event was held in August 2004, when the USA team defeated Puerto Rico to win the championship. Coleman helped the team the gold medal, scoring 8.6 points per game.

Coleman continued with the team as it became the U19 team, and competed in the 2005 U19 World Championships in Tunis, Tunisia. The USA team won all eight games, winning the gold medal. Coleman scored 8.1 points per game.

Coleman played for the USA team in the 2007 Pan American Games in Rio de Janeiro, Brazil. The team won all five games, earning the gold medal for the event.

WNBA career

Coleman was selected 2nd overall in the 2009 WNBA Draft by the Washington Mystics.

On March 28, 2014, Coleman signed a multi-year contract with the Indiana Fever.

Coleman participated in the 2015 WNBA All-Star Game.

On May 1, 2018, Coleman signed with the New York Liberty.

Europe
Edirnespor (2014-2015).

On July 13. 2015, Fenerbahçe Istanbul announced her transfer to the club.

References

1987 births
Living people
All-American college women's basketball players
American expatriate basketball people in Turkey
American women's basketball players
Basketball players at the 2007 Pan American Games
Basketball players from Portland, Oregon
Fenerbahçe women's basketball players
Indiana Fever players
Los Angeles Sparks players
Maryland Terrapins women's basketball players
Mersin Büyükşehir Belediyesi women's basketball players
McDonald's High School All-Americans
Pan American Games gold medalists for the United States
Pan American Games medalists in basketball
Parade High School All-Americans (girls' basketball)
Shooting guards
Small forwards
Washington Mystics draft picks
Washington Mystics players
Women's National Basketball Association All-Stars
Medalists at the 2007 Pan American Games
United States women's national basketball team players